Belovo may refer to:
Belovo, Bulgaria, a town in Pazardzhik Oblast, Bulgaria
Belovo, Russia, name of several inhabited localities in Russia
Belovo, Laško, a settlement in the Municipality of Laško, Slovenia